General Lindsay may refer to:

Alexander Lindsay (East India Company officer) (1785–1872), British East India Company general
Alexander Lindsay, 6th Earl of Balcarres (1752–1825), British Army general
Sir David Lindsay, 4th Baronet (c. 1732–1797), British Army general
George Lindsay (British Army officer) (1880–1956), British Army major general
James Lindsay (British Army officer) (1815–1874), British Army lieutenant general
James J. Lindsay (born 1932), U.S. Army four-star general
John Lindsay, 20th Earl of Crawford (1702–1749), British Army lieutenant general
Nathan J. Lindsay (1936–2015), U.S. Air Force major general
Richard C. Lindsay (1905–1990), U.S. Air Force lieutenant general
Walter Lindsay (1855–1930), British Army major general
William Bethune Lindsay (1880–1933), Canadian Corps major general

See also
George Lindsay-Crawford, 22nd Earl of Crawford (1758–1808), British Army major general
Julian Robert Lindsey (1871–1948), U.S. Army major general
Patrick Lindesay (1778–1839), British Army major general